"Walk The Same Line" is a song recorded by the German eurodance band Culture Beat. It was released in October 1996 as the fourth and final single from their third studio album Inside Out and it was released in 1996.. "Walk The Same Line" is also the final release from the Tania Evans and Jay Supreme line up. A CD Maxi Single containing remixes of "Walk The Same Line" was also released, under the name "Walk The Same Line Remix" 

The single reached its best chart positions as number 13 in Finland and number 14 in Belgium.

Music video
The music video for "Walk the Same Line" was directed by Martin Weisz.

Track listings

 CD Single (Germany, 1996)
 "Walk The Same Line" (Radio Edit) - 3:56
 "Walk The Same Line" (Euro Mix) - 5:21
 Mixed By: Perky Park

 CD Maxi Single (Europe, 1996)
 "Walk The Same Line" (Radio Edit) - 3:56
 "Walk The Same Line" (Extended Mix) - 5:59
 Mixed By: Perky Park
 "Walk The Same Line" (Euro Mix) - 5:21
 Mixed By: Perky Park
 "Walk The Same Line" (Mode 2 Joy Mix) - 6:28
 Remixed By: Michael Schendel, Tim Dobrovolny
 "Walk The Same Line" (Not Normal Mix - Classical Mix) - 2:53
 Remixed By:  Frank Bülow, Nino Tielman*, Peter Gräber, Peter Ries
 "Show You Heaven" - 4:58

 CD Maxi Single  - Remix (Europe, 1996)
 "Walk The Same Line" (Aboria Mix) - 6:23
 Remixed By: Nino Tielmann, Peter Gräber
 "Walk The Same Line" (Sweetbox Club Mix) - 5:33
 Remixed By: Geoman
 "Walk The Same Line" (Perky Park Mix) - 5:34
 Mixed By: Perky Park
 "Walk The Same Line" (Classical House Mix) - 6:15
 Remixed By: Peter Ries
 "Walk The Same Line" (Thors 66 Beat Mix) - 7:58
 Remixed By:Thorhallur Skulason
 "Walk The Same Line" (Brainstorm Mix) - 7:34
 Remixed By: Dietz, Beyer

 12" Maxi Vinyl Single (Germany, 1996)
 "Walk The Same Line" (Extended Mix) - 5:59
 Mixed By: Perky Park
 "Walk The Same Line" (Aboria Mix) - 6:22
 Remixed By: Nino Tielmann, Peter Gräber
 "Walk The Same Line" (Mode 2 Joy Mix) - 6:29
 Remixed By: Michael Schendel, Tim Dobrovolny
 "Walk The Same Line" (Brainstorm Mix) - 6:29
 Remixed By:  Dietz, Beyer
 "Walk The Same Line" (Euro Mix) - 5:22
 Mixed By: Perky Park

 12" Maxi Vinyl Single - Remix (Germany, 1996)
 "Walk The Same Line" (Sweetbox Club Mix) - 5:33
 Remixed By: Geoman
 "Walk The Same Line" (Perky Park Mix) - 5:34
 Remixed By: Perky Park
 "Walk The Same Line" (Classical House Mix) - 6:15
 Remixed By: Peter Ries
 "Walk The Same Line" (Thors 66 Beat Mix) - 7:58
 Remixed By: Thorhallur Skulason

Charts

References

1996 singles
Culture Beat songs
Songs written by Jay Supreme
1996 songs
Music videos directed by Martin Weisz
Dance Pool singles